The Auckland rugby league team is the team which traditionally represents all of the clubs which play in the Auckland Rugby League competition. As well as a senior men's team there are also Auckland representative teams throughout the various age groups such as under 15s, under 17s, under 19s and under 21s.

Under the new zone scheme introduced in 2010 the Auckland team represents the North Shore, East Auckland and West Auckland, while South Auckland is represented by the Counties Manukau rugby league team. The zone team is named the Akarana Falcons.

History

Auckland played its first game on 24 August 1908 when they took on Wellington at Victoria Park, Auckland in the first provincial game of rugby league in New Zealand. The Auckland Rugby League had not yet been formed so the side was not an official one as such.

Auckland had played against several touring teams over the years, though once the Auckland Warriors started playing in the 1995 ARL Premiership it diluted the standard of the representative side, and they have not played against full international sides in recent years. Auckland beat Australia, England and France in the space of 21 days in 1977. A feat which the Warriors commemorated by wearing replica strips in their clash with Australian club Manly-Warringah Sea Eagles in round 24 of the 2007 NRL season on 26 August 2007. The Warriors won 36–14 in front of a packed Mount Smart Stadium.

Current Auckland teams

The Akarana Falcons participate in the Albert Baskerville Trophy. This team represents the Hibiscus Coast Raiders, Richmond Bulldogs, Mt Wellington Warriors, Ponsonby Ponies, Glenora Bears, Ellerslie Eagles, Mt Albert Lions, Te Atatu Roosters, Bay Roskill Vikings, Northcote Tigers, Marist Saints, East Coast Bays Barracudas, Pt Chevalier Pirates, Waitemata Seagulls, Glenfield Greyhounds, New Lynn Stags and the Waiheke Rams.

Colours

Auckland representative sides traditionally wear a blue jersey with a white double 'V', in the same style of the New Zealand national rugby league team jersey but with blue instead of black, this is still the jersey worn by the Auckland Vulcans NSW Cup team.

Record versus overseas touring teams

1910 Auckland v Great Britain

The team for the match was: (fullback) Alf Chorley; (three-quarters) L Nolan, George Smith, Albert Asher; (five-eights) Alfred Jackson, Ronald MacDonald; (halfback) Len Farrant; (forwards) Fred Jackson (captain), Charles Dunning, Jim Griffin, Alex Stanaway, Harry Fricker, and George Seagar. The emergency players named were (backs) Sid Riley, Arthur Carlaw; (forwards) Joe Bennett, Jim Rukutai, and Bob Mitchell.

1912 Auckland v New South Wales
Auckland won their first victory over an ‘international’ side when they defeated New South Wales by 10 points to 3. The game was marred by several acts of violence with the visiting side said to be at fault repeatedly. Near the end of the match Sid Deane was sent off for punching Billy Curran.

1912 Auckland v New South Wales
New South Wales reversed their earlier loss with a comprehensive win over a disappointing Auckland effort. Charles Dunning and Bob Mitchell who had both been named to play originally were forced to withdraw due to illness and were replaced by Harry Fricker and Jim Griffin.

1913 Auckland v New South Wales

1914 Auckland v England

1919 Auckland v Australia

1920 Auckland v England

1922 Auckland v Australian Universities
The Australian University team was made up of players from Sydney University and Brisbane University.

1922 Auckland v Australian Universities

1922 Auckland v Australian Universities

1922 Auckland v New South Wales
Auckland played the touring New South Wales team in front of 20,000 spectators at the Auckland Domain but was heavily defeated with Australian legend Frank Burge running in 5 tries.

1922 Auckland Province v New South Wales
A few days after the match with New South Wales an Auckland provincial team took on the touring side. The Auckland team was largely made up of Auckland club players but also included Bill Te Whata who had played in Australia for the New Zealand Māori side, and a handful of others from the Waikato including former Auckland player Tim Peckham. They lost a tight match by 21 points to 20. Frank Burge was ordered off for disputing Wilson's try late in the match.

1924 Auckland v Australian Universities

1924 Auckland v Australian Universities

1924 Auckland v Australian Universities
Frank Delgrosso had to come on the replace George Davidson after he collided badly with teammate Clarrie Polson when they were both going after the ball. Polson received a bad cut over his eye and he also later had to retire and was replaced by Billy Ghent.

1924 Auckland v England
There is film footage of the match taken by Tarr Film and archived on the New Zealand Archive of Film, television and Sound Ngā Taonga website. In scoring on halftime Ben Davidson was knocked out. At the start of the second half Auckland attempted to replace him with Lou Brown who ran out on to the field. However the England captain when seeing this objected as replacements were forbidden in the second half of rugby league matches at this time. Auckland were forced to play with 12 players for a time until Davidson recovered well enough to return to the field.

1924 Auckland Province v England

1925 Auckland v Queensland

Auckland Province v Queensland

1928 Auckland Province v England 
The entire Auckland Provincial team were Auckland club players aside from Joe Menzies.

1928 Auckland v England

1932 Auckland v England

1935 Auckland v Australia (Australian tour match)
Australian legend Dave Brown who was renowned for his point scoring feats and was referred to as "the Bradman of league" scored 10 of Australia's 16 points. This was the first match Australia had played in New Zealand since their 1919 tour.

1935 Auckland Province v Australia (Australian tour match)

1936 Auckland v England
The Auckland team had been selected by Bert Avery and coached by Bert Cooke. Auckland competed well against a very strong England team before going down 22–16. Walter Cuthbert donated a trophy (a cap) for the best Auckland player which was selected by an Mr. R.F. Anderton, the touring teams co-manager as being Steve Watene. It was presented to him at the Auckland annual prize giving in November.

1946
Auckland 18, Australia 36 (Carlaw Park)
1949
Auckland 18, Australia 36 (Carlaw Park)
1953
Auckland 4 Australia 26 (Carlaw Park)
1954
Auckland 5 Great Britain 4
1955
Auckland 17 France 15
1960
Auckland 14 France 5
1961
Auckland 13 Australia 8 (Carlaw Park)
1962
Auckland 46 Great Britain 13
1965
Auckland 2 Australia 18 (Carlaw Park)
1969
Auckland 15 Australia 14 (Carlaw Park)
1971
Auckland 15 Australia 14 (Carlaw Park)
1974
Auckland 11 Great Britain 2
1975
Auckland 6 Australia 17 (Carlaw Park)
Auckland 9 France 3 (Carlaw Park)
1977
Auckland 19 Australia 15 (Carlaw Park)
Auckland 17 France 0
Auckland 14 Great Britain 10
1980
Auckland 7 Australia 21 (Carlaw Park)
1981
Auckland 20 France 10
1985
Auckland 10 Australia 50 (Carlaw Park)
1988
Auckland 30 Great Britain 14
1989
Auckland 26 Australia 24 (Carlaw Park)
1990
Auckland 24 Great Britain 13

New South Wales results 
1974 Amco Cup – 1 loss (round 2)
1975 Amco Cup – 1 win, 1 draw, 1 loss (semi-finals)
1976 Amco Cup – 1 win, 1 loss (round 2)
1977 Amco Cup – 1 loss (round 1)
1978 Amco Cup – 1 win, 1 loss (quarter-finals)
1979 Amco Cup – 3 losses (group stage)
1980 Tooth Cup – 1 loss (round 1)
1984 National Panasonic Cup – 1 loss (preliminary round)
1985 National Panasonic Cup – 1 loss (round 1)
2007 NSWRL Premier League (Auckland Lions)
2008 New South Wales Cup (Auckland Vulcans)
2009 New South Wales Cup (Auckland Vulcans)
2010 New South Wales Cup (Auckland Vulcans)
2011 New South Wales Cup (Auckland Vulcans)

Other matches
1949, Auckland Colts 16 Australia 30 (Carlaw Park)
1984, Auckland 16 Great Britain 14 (Carlaw Park)

Auckland representative record by year and decade
This does not include matches by Auckland Province which typically had players from the Waikato region in the early decades as it was a sub-union of Auckland. It also does not include matches by or between Auckland Pākehā and Auckland Māori.

Record by Opponent from 1908 to 1944

Auckland Māori v Auckland Pākehā
In 1936 the first ever match was played between Auckland Pākehā and Auckland Māori. It became an annual fixture thanks largely to the efforts of the Manukau club which successfully recruited brilliant Māori footballers from around the Auckland region and much of the North Island. Some of those players included Jack Hemi, Angus Gault, Frank Pickrang, Jack Brodrick, Tom Chase, Jack Broughton, Tame Kawe, Pita Ririnui, George Nepia, Jim Murray, Aubrey Thompson, George Shilton and many others.

1936

1937

1938

1939

1940

1941

1942

1943

1944

See also

Rugby league in New Zealand

References

External links

Rugby league in Auckland
1908 establishments in New Zealand
New Zealand rugby league teams